Cathedral of the Nativity of Christ may refer to:

 Cathedral of the Nativity of Christ, Cairo, a Coptic Orthodox cathedral in the as-yet-unnamed New Administrative Capital, Egypt
 Cathedral of the Nativity of Christ, Riga, an Orthodox cathedral in Riga, Latvia

See also 

 Cathedral of the Nativity (disambiguation)
 Church of the Nativity of Christ (disambiguation)
 Nativity of Christ (disambiguation)